Kabargin Oth Group is a group of volcanoes located in Georgia (South Ossetia). It consists of a dozen cinder cones and lava domes and is located near the border with Russia, southwest of Mount Kazbek volcano.

See also
 List of volcanoes in Georgia (country)

References 

Mountains of Georgia (country)
Volcanoes of Georgia (country)
Mountains of South Ossetia